The 1944 Western Michigan Broncos football team represented Michigan College of Education (later renamed Western Michigan University) as an independent during the 1944 college football season.  In their third season under head coach John Gill, the Broncos compiled a 4–3 record and outscored their opponents, 162 to 123.  The team played its home games at Waldo Stadium in Kalamazoo, Michigan.

Guard Dick Leahy was the team captain. Tackle Glenn Rodney received the team's most outstanding player award.

Schedule

References

Western Michigan
Western Michigan Broncos football seasons
Western Michigan Broncos football